The 2010–11 Argentine Primera B Metropolitana is the season of third division professional of football in Argentina. A total of 22 teams will compete; the champion will be promoted to Argentine Primera B Nacional.

Club information

Table

Standings

Torneo Reducido

Relegation

Relegation Playoff Matches

|-
!colspan="5"|Relegation/promotion playoff 1

|-
|}

See also
2010–11 in Argentine football

References

External links
List of Argentine second division champions by RSSSF

3
Primera B Metropolitana seasons